Carlos Humberto Rivas Torres (born 24 May 1953) is a Chilean retired professional footballer who played as a midfielder.

Career 
Rivas was a midfielder for Colo-Colo in 136 official games over five seasons, and he scored 40 goals during that time. While he was on the team, the team won two national championships (1979 and 1981) and two Polla Gol championships (1981 and 1982). In 1983, he played in the Canadian Professional Soccer League with Edmonton Eagles. The remainder of the 1983 season he played in the National Soccer League with Dinamo Latino, and played once more with the club during the 1985 season. Rivas served as an assistant under Dave Turner in 1986, but still performed as a player for the Toronto Blizzard in the National Soccer League. 

In late 1986, he signed with league rivals Toronto Italia. In 1987, he served as a player-coach in the National Soccer League with Chile Lindo. On 26 August 1987, he was suspended from the league for four years for his participation in a brawl between Chile and Windsor Wheels.

International career
Carlos Rivas played for Colo-Colo, a Chilean football team, from 1978 to 1982.

Rivas also represented the Chile national team at the 1982 FIFA World Cup.

Rivas was a key figure in the development of a style of football involving prejugadas and creative offensive strategies.

Managerial career 
Rivas served as an assistant coach for the Toronto Blizzard in the National Soccer League in 1986 under head coach Dave Turner. In 1987, he served as a  player-coach in the National Soccer League with Chile Lindo. In 2015, he joined the technical staff of the York Region Shooters in the Canadian Soccer League. He founded the CR Soccer Academy in Southern Ontario.

Personal life
Rivas moved to Canada in 1984. He is the father of one son and one daughter. His son is Canadian soccer player Carlos Rivas Godoy.

He is the son-in-law of Adán Godoy, a Chilean former international goalkeeper, with whom he coincided in Santiago Morning in 1977.

External links
 Official site

References

1953 births
Living people
People from Colchagua Province
Chilean footballers
Chile international footballers
Chilean expatriate footballers
Chilean emigrants to Canada
Association football midfielders
Audax Italiano footballers
C.D. Antofagasta footballers
Deportes Concepción (Chile) footballers
Santiago Morning footballers
Colo-Colo footballers
Santiago Wanderers footballers
Edmonton Eagles players
Unión Española footballers
Toronto Blizzard (1986–1993) players
Toronto Italia players
Chilean Primera División players
Primera B de Chile players
Canadian Professional Soccer League (original) players
Canadian National Soccer League players
Chilean expatriate sportspeople in Canada
Expatriate soccer players in Canada
1979 Copa América players
1982 FIFA World Cup players
Chilean football managers
Chilean expatriate football managers
Canadian National Soccer League coaches
Expatriate soccer managers in Canada
Association football player-managers